Rui Miguel Garcia Lopes de Almeida (born 29 September 1969) is a Portuguese professional football manager, currently in charge of French club Chamois Niortais FC.

After working as an assistant to Jesualdo Ferreira, he worked mainly in France, with Bastia in Ligue 1 and four clubs in Ligue 2, as well as a brief spell in his country's Primeira Liga with Gil Vicente.

Managerial career
Almeida spent his early managerial career as an assistant at Estoril and Trofense. His first stint as a professional manager was with the Syria under-23 team in an attempt for qualification to the 2012 Summer Olympics. A polyglot (speaking Portuguese, Italian, Spanish, Arabic, English and French), he left Syria to become assistant manager to Jesualdo Ferreira at Panathinaikos, Sporting, Braga and Zamalek before managing again with Red Star in Ligue 2 in June 2015. He was dismissed in December 2016 when the club was in 16th, and had been eliminated from the Coupe de France by fifth-tier Blagnac.

Almeida then joined Bastia in Ligue 1 in February 2017, on a two-and-a-half-year contract; the Corsican team was five points within the relegation zone. He left in June, as the team faced a financial crisis after their descent. 

On 30 May 2018, Almeida was announced as the manager of Troyes in Ligue 2, on a two-year deal. He led the team to third, one point off promotion, in his only season and was then linked to English club West Bromwich Albion, though no official approach was ever made.

In July 2019, Almeida was appointed manager of Caen, newly relegated to Ligue 2. He signed a two-year deal with the option of a third, and compensation was paid for his remaining year contracted to Troyes. After a poor start to the season, he was removed from his duties on 28 September.

Almeida was given his first outright job in his own country at the end of May 2020, when he was chosen to succeed Vítor Oliveira at Gil Vicente in the Primeira Liga. He lost his job on 10 November, having won once in seven games and lost the last four.

On 4 September 2022, Almeida returned to the French second tier, taking over at Niort ahead of the seventh game of the season, on a one-year contract with a second as an option.

References

External links
Rui Almeida at Zerozero.pt 

1969 births
Living people
Sportspeople from Lisbon
Portuguese football managers
Portuguese expatriate football managers
Ligue 1 managers
Ligue 2 managers
Red Star F.C. managers
SC Bastia managers
ES Troyes AC managers
Stade Malherbe Caen managers
Chamois Niortais F.C. managers
Primeira Liga managers
Gil Vicente F.C. managers
Portuguese expatriates in France
Portuguese expatriates in Egypt
Portuguese expatriates in Greece
Portuguese expatriates in Syria
Expatriate football managers in Egypt
Expatriate football managers in France
Expatriate football managers in Greece
Expatriate football managers in Syria